Horseshoe Bend Farm is a  park in the western suburbs of Melbourne, Australia, adjacent to Brimbank Park on the Maribyrnong River. Formerly a commercial farm, it is now managed by Parks Victoria, but no longer has any livestock. An original 1930s weatherboard cottage still exists on the site. Previously the park was closed for nearly five years but has recently opened again.

External links
Parks Victoria

Metropolitan parks of Victoria (Australia)